Kamini Mohan Dewan (1890 – 1976) was a Bangladeshi politician from Rangamati. He was elected as a member of the East Bengal Legislative Assembly in 1954. His son  Binoy Kumar Dewan served as the state minister of the Ministry of Local Government, Rural Development and Co-operatives.

Biography
Dewan was born on 1890. He founded Parbatya Chattagram Janasamiti in 1920. Later, he established Hill Tracts People Organization in 1950. He was elected as a member of the East Bengal Legislative Assembly in 1954.

Dewan died in 1976. He wrote an autobiography titled Parbotya Chattagramer Din Seboker Jibon Kahini.

References

1890 births
1976 deaths
People from Rangamati District